World's End is a British mystery drama television series, created by Danny Spring and Diane Whitley, which premiered on 28 March 2015 on CBBC. It stars Amy Robbins as Stephanie Morelle and twins Carlos and Marco Esparza as her two sons, Noah and Luke.

Synopsis
American-raised twins Noah & Luke arrive with their mother at a remote castle, where they meet Cat Sharpe (Jade Johnson), Gaia Roberts (Pearl Appleby), AJ Javadi (Vahid Gold), Slim Butt (Sam Glen) & Lexy Winters (Sophia Carr Gomm). They soon discover that they are surrounded by mysteries, and their pasts are all connected. Can they discover the truth before it's too late?

Cast

The Castle
Carlos Esparza as Luke Morelle
Marco Esparza as Noah Morelle
Amy Robbins as Professor Stephanie Morelle, Noah & Luke's mother
Paul Warriner as Duncan Morelle, Noah & Luke's father (previously presumed to be dead)
Sophia Carr Gomm as Alexa "Lexy" Winters
Kazia Pelka as Lena Winters, quasi-military commander of World's End, Lexy's mother
Daymon Britton as Casey Winters / The Origin, the series' main antagonist
Pearl Appleby as Gaia Roberts
Adam Astill as Marcus Roberts, Gaia's father
Vahid Gold as Adam "AJ" Javadi Junior
Andonis Anthony as Adam Javadi Senior, AJ's father
Sam Glen as Lars "Slim" Butt
Jade Johnson as Caitlain "Cat" Sharpe

The Village
Jenni Keenan Green as Moira Campbell, owner of Moira's Cafe and Gregor's Mother
Lorn Macdonald as Gregor Campbell, Moira's son
Erin Armstrong as Mackenzie, local resident who becomes AJ's girlfriend
Corinne Shane as Skink Cullen, Mackenzie's best mate

Location of World's End
The exterior is represented by Bamburgh Castle in Northumberland. However, a map shown in the episode "Divided We Stand" is a modified version of the area around Berriedale, Caithness.

Episodes

External links
 

BBC children's television shows
2010s British children's television series